Raj Kapoor (born Shrishti Nath Kapoor; 14 December 1924  2 June 1988) was an Indian actor, film director and film producer who worked in Bollywood films. He was fondly called "Raj Sahab", "The Showman", "The Greatest Show Man of Indian cinema", "Ranbir Raj Kapoor", and "Charlie Chaplin of Indian cinema" by his family, friends and fans. Kapoor worked in many films, and his filmography is listed below.

Filmography

See also 
 List of awards and nominations received by Raj Kapoor

References

External links 
 Raj Kapoor filmography at Bollywood Hungama

Indian filmographies
Male actor filmographies
Raj Kapoor